Colegio del Verbo Divino ("College of the Divine Word" in Spanish) is a school in Chile catering to grades from pre-kindergarten through 12th grade (cuarto medio).  It was founded in 1950 by the Congregación del Verbo Divino (Society of the Divine Word), which continues administration of the school to the present day.  The organization and school's mission is that of forming leaders of the Catholic viewpoint, who will work to contribute social justice and solidarity.

The all-boys school is located in the neighbourhood of El Golf within the municipality of Las Condes.  The school is recognized for its academic excellence and competitive sports teams, such as track and field and soccer. Many affluent Chileans, including politicians, economists, businessmen, entrepreneurs, scientists, artists, and sportsmen, have passed through its doors, including former president Sebastián Piñera''.

References

External links
Official site (in Spanish)

Schools in Santiago Metropolitan Region
Educational institutions established in 1950
Boys' schools in Chile
Catholic schools in Chile
1950 establishments in Chile